Frank Campbell (born 23 December 1950) is a Scottish professional footballer who played as a midfielder.

References

1950 births
Living people
People from Perth and Kinross
Scottish footballers
Association football midfielders
Grimsby Town F.C. players
English Football League players